Julie Larsen Piers (born September 16, 1962) is an American professional golfer who played on the LPGA Tour. She played under both her maiden name, Julie Larsen, and her married name, Julie Piers (since 1995).

Larsen played on the Futures Tour and Ladies European Tour before joining the LPGA Tour in 1992. She won once on the LPGA Tour in 1995.

The best finish for Piers in major championship came at the 1996 LPGA Championship. A sudden death playoff between Piers and Laura Davies was narrowly averted when Davies sank an eight-foot par putt on the last hole of the tournament. Piers finished in solo second place.

Professional wins

LPGA Tour wins (1)

References

External links

American female golfers
Rollins Tars women's golfers
LPGA Tour golfers
Golfers from New York (state)
People from Westchester County, New York
1962 births
Living people